Las Chinchillas National Reserve is a nature reserve located in the Choapa Province, Coquimbo Region, Chile. The reserve gives shelter to some of the few remaining colonies of Long-tailed Chinchillas in the wild.

Biology
In addition to the chinchillas, other small mammals (mainly rodents), two fox species and felines like the Puma inhabit the reserve and surrounding hills.  Actually only about half of the wild chinchillas are located within the reserve boundaries.  The other half live on private and communally owned lands.

The reserve is home to a number of species of birds, including the Chilean mockingbird, Chilean tinamou, long-tailed meadowlark, moustached turca and Harris's hawk. Owl species inhabiting the park include the burrowing owl, austral pygmy-owl and great horned owl.  The Andean condor can also be seen in the area.

References
 Reserva Nacional Las Chinchillas

National reserves of Chile
Protected areas of Coquimbo Region